The National Constituent Assembly  was a constituent assembly in the Republic of China, assembled for drafting the Constitution of the Republic of China. Meetings were convened in November and December 1946 at National Great Hall, Nanking.

Boycotted by Chinese Communist Party (CCP) and allies, the Assembly was joined by Chinese Nationalist Party (or Kuomintang, KMT), Young China Party (Youth), and China Democratic Socialist Party (CDSP), with delegates directly or indirectly elected. The Constitution drafted by the Assembly was considered to have resulted in the issue of Two Chinas with distinct constitutions.

Background 
Under Plans (or Fundamentals) of National Reconstruction proposed by Sun Yat-sen, later honoured as founding father of the Republic of China, the revolution was divided into three stages: military-rule, political tutelage, and constitutional government.

One of the earliest constitutions of the Republic of China was promulgated by Tsao Kun in 1923 (Tsao's Constitution; 曹錕憲法). The junta based in Canton, led by Sun from Kuomintang, boycotted the enactment and called for the convocation of National Convention for drafting a new constitution.

Following the Peking Coup in 1924 that overthrown Tsao's government, Sun accepted the invitation by Feng Yu-hsiang to convene National Convention. Sun, however, died in 1925 and the Convention was abandoned. The will left by Sun before his death includes the convocation of such meetings.

Upon the conclusion of Northern Expedition in 1928, one-party rule by the KMT began and so was the drafting of the new constitution. In 1936, a new constitutional draft (May Fifth draft; 五五憲草) was announced.

The authorities decided to convene a National Constituent Assembly in 1937 to adopt the draft, only to be delayed by the Second Sino-Japanese War. The Assembly was further delayed to 1946 for various reasons.

On 1 January 1946 or the 35th anniversary of the Republic of China, Chiang announced the decision of convening the Assembly by the end of the year. After six delays, the Assembly was finally convened on 15 November 1946 after Young China Party and China Democratic Socialist Party confirmed the attending delegates.

Electoral method 
An election was held in 1936 across the nation to elect members of the Assembly, except in Japanese-occupied Northeast China which special elections substituted direct elections. The Nationalist Government invited celebrities unwilling to campaign for the election to the Assembly, while members of KMT's Central Committee were designated as ex-officio members of the Assembly. CCP was unable to participate in the election due to KMT-CCP civil war and could only enter the Assembly with party-list quota. Tenure of the elected and selected members of the Assembly was extended to 1946 due to the delay of the Assembly.

Political Consultative Conference 
After the victory in Sino-Japanese War in 1945, the Chinese Government was urged by the public to convene the Assembly. KMT and CCP, which by then became a substantial anti-government force, along with China Democratic League (CDL), Young China Party, and independents, convened  on 10 January 1946 in Chungking. The Conference, lasted until 31 January, adopted 12 resolutions including reforming government, amending draft constitution, and convening National Constituent Assembly. A committee on organising draft constitution was also formed.

The membership quota of the National Constituent Assembly was one of the rifts between Nationalists and the Communists. CCP and CDL demanded disqualifying the members elected in 1936, while KMT insisted the membership was still legitimate and rejected the idea of disqualification for respecting the integrity of the government and the law. Both sides eventually compromised on disqualifying the unelected members of the Assembly, i.e., appointed members in special elections and ex-officio members of KMT's Central Committee, and replacing them with party representatives.

Resolution on National Assembly by Political Consultative Conference (translation)

 The National Assembly to be convened on 5 May 1946.
 The duties of the first session of the National Assembly shall be enacting the constitution.
 The adoption of the constitution shall be agreed by three-fourths of attending members.
 The membership of 1,200 delegates elected by Areas and Occupational Groups shall be unchanged.
 Taiwan and Northeast shall be assigned with additional 150 delegates in total for Areas and Occupational Groups.
 Political parties and dignitaries shall be assigned with additional 700 delegates; distribution of such shall be in accordance with the annexed terms.
 The total number of delegates of the National Assembly shall be 2,050.
 Authority for implementing constitutionalism as stipulated by the constitution shall, within six months upon promulgation of the constitution, hold elections and convene (the National Assembly) in accordance with the constitution.

Annex:

 Representatives sent to the National Assembly by the political parties shall uphold the drafted constitution as amended in the Political Consultative Conference in the National Assembly.
 Any advice on improving the constitution draft shall be decided after temporary consultation between the parties.
 The distribution of additional delegates for political parties and dignitaries is as follows:
 Nationalist Party, 230 members
 Communist Party, 200 members
 Youth Party, 100 members
 Democratic League, 100 members
 Dignitaries, 100 members
 The Nationalist Party and the Communist Party shall each yield 10 members to the Democratic League.

Civil war
Despite the new constitution draft (Conference Draft; 政協憲草) and other important agreements, the relation between the KMT and CCP worsened sharply after KMT's Central Committee meeting in March 1946 due to ideological differences and lack of mutual trust. Conflicts and skirmishes in Northeast broke out a month later.

Negotiations between two sides in Chungking and Nanking were also near breakdown. Over the membership of reformed coalition government, communists insisted on assigning 14 members to CCP and CDL out of 40 to secure one-third veto power. KMT, in return, only agreed on assigning 13. The standoff prolonged for more than half a year without much progress.

Members

Session

Pre-meeting controversies

According to resolution of Political Consultative Conference, the National Constituent Assembly shall be convened on 5 May 1946, anniversary of Sun's inauguration as "Extraordinary Great President" (非常大總統). Nevertheless, it was forced to delay as CCP and CDL declined to submit list of delegates amid stalled negotiations with KMT on reforming the government. The diplomatic mission by George C. Marshall, United States Special Envoy to China, to broker peace between two sides also failed.

With the aim of ending the party-rule as soon as possible, Kuomintang decided to convene, unilaterally, the National Assembly on 12 November, the birthday of Sun, claiming the communists continued the armed rebellion. The decision was immediately opposed by CCP and CDL, then both decided to boycott the Assembly. Youth rested with the decision of participating, while CDSP split with CDL with the internally assigned quota of 40 delegates, hoping CDL would reverse their boycott. The communists later described the decision of participating in the "puppet National Assembly" as the "touchstone" distinguishing whether the party is standing with the people.

Opening of Assembly

On 11 October 1946, Chiang Kai-shek, chairman of the Nationalist Government, ordered the convention of the National Assembly, after strategic town Changchiakow was recovered from the communists. Originally planned on 12 November, the Assembly was further delayed for three days to await delegation list from Youth and CDSP.

The Assembly opened on 15 November, but then adjourned as CDSP had not submitted the list yet, which only did on 20 November. As the required quorum of 75% was met, the Assembly re-convened without CCP and CDL. In addition to 1936-elected members of mainland China, members from Taiwan joined the meeting as Japanese rule ended in 1945. The Assembly elected the Presidium to rotate the chairmanship, and chose Hung Lan-yu as Secretary-general, Chen Chi-tien and Lei Chen as vice secretary-general.

The presidium was elected by a total of 1,446 delegates. Some resigned upon election, as indicated by strikethrough, and replaced by italicised supplementary members. Members of the presidium are as follows, with votes received bracketed.

 Chiang Kai-shek (1,371)
 Sun Fo (1,246)
 Pai Chung-hsi (1,193)
 Yu Yu-jen (1,165)
 Tseng Chi (1,125)
 Hu Shih (1,099)
 Wu Tieh-cheng (1,053)
 Chen Kuo-fu (1,035)
 Li Huang (1,026)
 Tso Shun-sheng (左舜生; 1,020)
 Cheng Chien (982)
 Serengdongrub (958)
 Wu Yi-fang (953)
 Tsou Lu (鄒魯; 939)
 Chang Li-sheng (913)
 Paul Yu Pin (905)
 Mo Teh-hui (876)
 Kung Keng (孔庚; 851)
 Ku Cheng-kang (844)
 Chen Chi-tien (陳啓天; 844)
 Li Tsung-jen (841)
 Chang Chun (830)
 Wu Ching-heng (802)
 Chen Cheng (798)
 Thubten? (圖丹桑批; 793)
 Chen Li-fu (788)
 Chu Ching-nung (朱經農; 775)
 Ehmetjan Qasim (739)
 Hu Shu-hua (720)
 Kung Hsiang-hsi (706)
 Chu Chia-hua (689)
 Lin Ching-nien (林慶年; 681)
 He Cheng-chun (670)
 Huang Kuo-shu (633)
 Chang Chi (631)
 Liang Han-tsao (梁寒操; 615)
 Kuo Chung-wei (郭仲隗; 614)
 Huang Yun-su (黃芸蘇; 604)
 Tseng Kuo-ching (曾擴情; 588)
 Tuan Hsi-peng (段錫朋; 561)
 Sun Wei-yu (558)
 Liu Heng-ching (527)
 Wang Yun-wu (520)
 He Chung-han (賀衷寒; 436)
 Wang Te-pu (王德溥; 434)
 Yu Ching-tang (427)
 Shao Li-tzu (邵力子; 425)
 Ting Wei-fen (419)
 Tien Chung-chin (408)
 Chou Yung-neng (周雍能; 401)
 Li Tai-ming (李大明)
 Hsu Fu-lin

Party-or-state dispute 

Upon entering the National Great Hall, opposition parties including CDSP and Youth requested replacing the party flag of Kuomintang with national flag, arguing the National Assembly is not party congress. The authorities agreed and therefore took off the party flag.

The two parties then declined to take oath of office, claiming the Tridemism references in the oath were incompatible with the ideology of their parties, and insisted the importance of freedom of thought.

Deliberation 

The debate on the constitution draft adopted the three readings procedures. Prior to the first reading, some delegates proposed drafting a new constitution by the Legislative Yuan, instead of following the agreed "Conference Draft". The Assembly later decided to deliberate with "Conference Draft" as the basis after opposition from the minor parties.

On 28 November, Chiang tabled the "Conference Draft" in the Assembly for consideration, starting the first reading. A number of nationalist delegates were resentful as they deemed the draft deviated from Sun's Five-power constitution model, therefore reverted the proposal to "May Fifth Draft" version within a week. Under CDSP's threat of quitting the Assembly, Chiang, also head of Kuomintang, convinced his party colleagues to respect the minor parties. A week later, the draft was reverted back to the original version. Most of the amendments were also rejected for breaching the resolution of Political Consultative Conference after the urge from leaders of KMT and CDSP. In total, 104 out of 151 amendments proposed in the first reading were voted down, with 98% of the draft kept from the "Conference Draft". Chiang reaffirmed the hope to establish a parliamentary system in the constitution to shun communists from attacking the constitution as "fascism" for empowering the executive and presidency.

Second reading began on 21 December immediately after first reading. The draft was gone through clause by clause with details heavily debated. Delegates disputed whether the capital shall be Nanking or Peking, eventually resolved with no specific reference in the constitution. It was also argued that Manchu shall enjoy autonomy equal to Mongols and Tibetan, but rejected on basis that Manchu and Han are under one family. Another issue over assigning one-fifth quota to woman in the National Assembly was settled by stipulating that "[the] number of delegates to be elected by women's organizations shall be prescribed by law".

Third reading commenced on 24 December with only minor amendments on the draft. The Constitution of the Republic of China was formally adopted on the other day, along with the implementation timeframe. Both document were handed to Chiang by Wu Ching-heng, chairman of the closing ceremony of the National Assembly. The Assembly, and the drafting of the constitution, were thus concluded.

According to the timeline, the constitution shall be promogulated on 1 January 1947 and come into effect on 25 December 1947.

Aftermath 

Following the end of National Constituent Assembly, the Nationalist Government offered an olive branch towards the communists at three occasions in January 1947. CCP insisted on repealing the constitution and restoring to the troop positions as of January 1946 as the fundamental prerequisites to restart negotiations. In June, CCP was officially banned by the Chinese Government, with party leaders including Mao Zedong wanted.

With the Constitution publicized, the government was reformed three months after in line with resolutions of the Political Consultative Conference, ending one-party rule. General election was held in November, with the Constitution finally implemented on 25 December 1947.

The National Assembly, under the new constitution, was convened on 29 March 1948, receiving the power transferred from the Nationalist Government. All five "Yuans" (branches) were convened in May by the President, elected as prescribed by the constitution and the election law, signaling a new stage of constitutionalism.

Reaction
Kuomintang believed the National Constituent Assembly cannot be further delayed, citing the urgency to end the party-rule and return power to the people, and the fact that most of the delegates arrived the capital for the Assembly. Kuomintang further argued the constitution adopted was in line with the principles agreed by all parties including the rebellious Communists, and therefore their objection was unjustifiable.

Communist Party, on the other hand, claimed Kuomintang was "receiving order from the United States", and the convocation of the "puppet" National Assembly was breaching the resolutions agreed in the Political Consultative Conference as the government was not reformed in advance. The communists said the National Assembly was to legitimise the civil war and aid by the United States, and that the adopted "fascist" constitution is restricting human rights and making presidency a dictatorship.

Marshall, the United States Special Envoy, as the third party, said "[in] fact, the National Assembly has adopted a democratic constitution which in all major aspects is in accordance with the principles laid down by the all-party Political Consultative Conference of last January. It is unfortunate that the Communists did not see fit to participate in the Assembly since the constitution that has been adopted seems to include every major point that they wanted."

Notes

References

Sources

See also 

 Constitution of the Republic of China
 National Assembly (Republic of China)
 1947 Chinese National Assembly election
 1948 Chinese legislative election
 1948 Chinese presidential election
 Constitution of the People's Republic of China

Historical legislatures in China
Defunct organizations based in China
1946 establishments in China
1946 disestablishments in China
Constituent assemblies